The Challenge: Cutthroat is the 20th season of the MTV reality competition series, The Challenge.

Filmed in Prague, Czech Republic, Cutthroat features a first-ever three-team format with cast members from The Real World, Road Rules, and The Challenge. The season premiered on Wednesday, October 6, 2010, and concluded with the "S#!% They Should Have Shown" special on December 22, 2010.

Format
This season of The Challenge features a new format, consisting of three teams. A race to the "Gulag" was held to determine the selections of the teams. The three players that finished last in the race — Camila Nakagawa, Shauvon Torres and Emilee Fitzpatrick — were chosen as the team captains. Those three selected players, alternating between male and female, until each team was split evenly — five men and five women on each team — see Cast and Draft sections below.

The three teams will participate in numerous challenges (sometimes called "missions"), which are followed by an elimination challenge, known as the "Gulag." The team who wins a challenge will receive a cash prize of $20,000 to be banked in their team bank accounts, as well as winning immunity from the Gulag.

The two losing teams will then be forced to choose one player of each gender from their own teams for possible elimination. Each player will cast secret votes to decide which two men and two women will battle in same-gender Gulags. The winning players will rejoin their respective teams and stay in the game for a chance at a share of $120,000, while the losing players will be eliminated from the game.

Cast members who had been eliminated were removed from the opening credits, leaving only current members of the three teams left. It is the first (and so far only) time in challenge history that this has occurred.

In the event a vote is tied, a run-off vote is conducted. If the run-off does not resolve the tie, the player going into the Gulag from the opposing team selects any (same-sex) member of the other team to send to the Gulag.

Contestants

Note: Chris "CT" Tamburello (The Real World: Paris) and Tina Barta (Road Rules: South Pacific) participated as "Heavy Hitters" in Episode 8/9's Gulag.

Draft

Gameplay

Challenge games
 Gas Problems: Teams have to assemble a five-layered puzzle, and each puzzle has different diagrams that are locked in five separate boxes. In order to unlock the boxes, players have to enter a gas chamber in pairs, and memorize combinations of codes and letters that will unlock the boxes containing the diagrams. The first team to correctly assemble their puzzle together wins.
 Winner: Grey Team
 Brain Buster: Players from each team are suspended upside down from ropes in front of the Průmyslový palác in Prague, and have to transfer color-coded beer steins from one end of a course to another by swinging toward their team members, and having their teammates place the steins on color-coded pedestals. The team that transfers the most beer steins within a 15-minute time limit wins. (Note: Since there were eight ropes present and ten players from the Red and Grey teams, those teams had to sit out two players each.)
 Winner: Blue Team
 Bed Head: A series of five beds is suspended from a platform 40 feet above the water, and players from each team have to jump one-by-one from bed to bed, with each bed decreasing in size from start to finish. Once an entire team has landed on the same bed, the process continues until each team member has landed on the last bed at the end of the platform. Players are disqualified if they fall into the water, or if one player is touching their bed with their hands when a teammate jumps to join that player on the bed. The team that makes it to the last bed with the fewest disqualifications and in the fastest time wins.
 Winner: Red Team
 Bottleneck Stampede: Players from each team have to push their way simultaneously through a giant obstacle course, with each obstacle creating its own "bottleneck." The first team to get all their players across a finish line wins.
 Winner: Red Team
 Surf's Up: Teams jump onto a platform that is hanging from a side of a cliff, 40 feet above water. Teams jump onto a "flying surfboard" in pairs, and players have to "surf" as far as possible before falling into water, then swim around two buoys, and ring a bell once they reach the other side of the lagoon. The team with the fastest average time wins.
 Winner: Grey Team
 Sky Hook: Players from each team have to climb onto a series of metal rings that are hanging from a platform suspended high above water. Players have to pass basketballs from one teammate to another until the player closest to the basket can shoot basketballs into a basket that is also hanging from a platform. Each player has to be on a ring before any balls can be transferred from player to player. A team loses one ball for each player that falls into water. Each team has 10 basketballs and a 20-minute time limit to shoot as many balls into a basket as possible. The team that makes the most baskets in the fastest time wins.
 Winner: Grey Team
 Gimme a Hand: Teams have to walk on a tightrope suspended high above ground, from one nine-story building to another at Prosek Point in Prague. Players try to advance on the tightropes in pairs, with their hips and ankles attached to their partner, and have to use overhead ropes to guide them on the tightropes. The team with the most players advancing from building to building in the fastest time wins.
 Winner: Blue Team
 High Ball: Teams have to transfer and balance balls uphill in pairs, on a ball carrier that resembles an oversize martini glass with a flat lid. Two players have to hold the ball carrier while one player loads a ball to the top of the ball carrier, and each pair of players has to deposit balls into a high basket at the top of the hill, using the ball carrier. The team that transfers the most balls into their basket within a 90-minute time limit wins.
 Winner: Grey Team
 Riot Act: Players have to knock players from opposing teams off a square dirt platform and into a mud pit, using glass riot shields. The challenge is played in two rounds: guys vs. guys and girls vs. girls. A team is still in the game as long as one teammate is still in the platform. If there are two different winners after each gender has been knocked out of the platform in each round, one player from each winning team will face off in a head-to-head match, in which the last player standing wins the challenge for their team and well as an automatic bid to the final challenge.
 Winner: Grey Team

Gulag games
Handcuffs: Players have to wrestle rings out of their opponent's hands. The first player to wrestle rings out of their opponent's hands five times wins.
Played By: Brandon vs. Derek, Camila vs. Emilee, Brandon vs. Derrick & Emily vs. Melinda
Back Up Off Me: Players are tied to each other, back-to-back, and have to drag their opponent to knock over their own barrel. The first player to knock over their own barrel twice wins. In Episode 9, a variation of the Back Up Off Me: challenge was played where both Gulag Nominees played against a "Heavy Hitter". The winner would be the player that wins the fastest time or alternatively, lasts longer before their Heavy Hitter wins.
Played By: Brandon vs. JD, Cara Maria vs. Mandi, Johnny vs. Tyler (Heavy Hitter: CT) & Theresa vs. Tori (Heavy Hitter: Tina)
Die Hard: Players have to stand, kneel on and roll oversize dice, without any body parts touching the ground. The players have to match the number that T. J. Lavin rolls prior to the Gulag. The first player to roll their die into a designated square with the matching number facing up wins.
Played By: Eric vs. Vinny, Dan vs. Dunbar & Camila vs. Laurel
Swat: Players are chained by their necks at a table, and have to slap each other in the face with fly swatters (while wearing protective goggles). After multiple rounds of "swatting", players have to hold up a bucket filled with dirt with one arm, while continuing to slap their opponent in the face with fly swatters. The opponent wins if a player drops their bucket to the ground.
Played By: Katie vs. Ayiiia & Luke vs. Eric
Pole Me Over: Players have to grab a pole, and push their opponent backwards toward their own barrels. The first player to knock over their opponent's barrels twice wins.
Played By: Brandon vs. Ty, Camila vs. Katie, Derrick vs. Tyler & Emily vs. Paula

Czech Point final challenge
The final challenge begins with each team sprinting to the first checkpoint, "Seeing Spots," in which each team has to designate one player to stand in front of a wall containing five white targets, and one teammate has to hit each target with a paint ball gun before advancing. The next checkpoint is "So Tired," in which teams have to roll oversize tires on the tarmac. The next checkpoint is "Down & Dirty," in which players have to slide through an obstacle course containing a dirt pit. At the "Free Ride" checkpoint, one player from each team has to lie on a stretcher while their teammate carries them to the next check point. (Note: Since the Blue Team only had two members — Emily & Jenn, they instead carried a mannequin on the stretcher.) At the "Hard Wood" checkpoint, each team must transfer a pile of wood to the top of a hangar in a designated area before advancing to the "Sign Language" checkpoint, in which each team has to memorize the placement of a sign post containing Czech road signs, then crawl through an obstacle course through mud and under barb wire, then swim through a lake. After swimming through a lake, each team has to slide a series of Czech road signs through a pole to duplicate the sign post from the earlier "Sign Language" checkpoint. If a team slides in each sign correctly, they can advance, otherwise, they have to return to the original "Sign Language" checkpoint. The final stretch involves a sprint to the top of Bezděz Castle.
 The Challenge: Cutthroat Winner: Red Team

Game summary

Elimination chart

Cutthroat progress

Teams
 The contestant is on the Red team
 The contestant is on the Blue team
 The contestant is on the Grey team
Competition
 The contestant's team won the competition
 The contestant's team did not win the final challenge
 The contestant's team won the challenge and was safe from the Gulag
 The contestant's team lost the challenge, but the contestant was not chosen for the Gulag
 The contestant was chosen for the Gulag, but did not have to compete
 The contestant won the Gulag
 The contestant won the Gulag by default
 The contestant lost the Gulag and was eliminated
 The contestant was disqualified in the Gulag and was eliminated
 The contestant withdrew from the competition prior to the Gulag
 The contestant was removed from the competition due to medical reasons

Voting progress

Partners

Episodes
In contrast to past seasons of The Challenge, the title sequence features only the players that are still in the game for that episode (in past seasons, every player that participated would be shown, even after elimination).

Reunion special
The Challenge: Cutthroat Reunion was aired after the season finale on December 15, 2010, and was hosted by Maria Menounos. The cast members who attended the reunion were: Luke, Sarah, Brad, Tori, Paula, Tyler, Dunbar, Derrick, Emily, Laurel, Abram, Cara Maria, Eric, Johnny and Jenn.

Controversy
During the third episode of the season, which aired on October 20, 2010, Fresh Meat II castmember Laurel Stucky drunkenly directed a series of insults at Fresh Meat castmember Eric Banks, regarding Banks' body image. Stucky later issued a tearful apology on MTV.com after the episode aired, however, at the Reunion special, Banks confronted and chided Stucky for the lack of sincerity and making the apology on MTV.com instead of apologizing to Banks in person during filming, though Stucky claimed that Banks brushed her off following the incident.

Notes

References

External links
 

The Challenge (TV series)
Television shows set in the Czech Republic
2010 American television seasons
Television shows filmed in the Czech Republic